Events from the year 1920 in Michigan.

Office holders

State office holders
 Governor of Michigan: Albert Sleeper (Republican)
 Lieutenant Governor of Michigan: Luren D. Dickinson (Republican) 
 Michigan Attorney General: Alexander J. Groesbeck (Republican)
 Michigan Secretary of State: Coleman C. Vaughan (Republican)
 Speaker of the Michigan House of Representatives: Thomas Read (Republican)
 Chief Justice, Michigan Supreme Court:

Mayors of major cities

 Mayor of Detroit: James J. Couzens (Republican)
 Mayor of Grand Rapids: Christian Gallmeyer/John McNabb
 Mayor of Flint: George C. Kellar/Edwin W. Atwood
 Mayor of Lansing: Benjamin A. Kyes

Federal office holders

 U.S. Senator from Michigan: Truman Handy Newberry (Republican)
 U.S. Senator from Michigan: Charles E. Townsend (Republican) 
 House District 1: Frank Ellsworth Doremus (Democrat)
 House District 2: Earl C. Michener (Republican)
 House District 3: John M. C. Smith (Republican)
 House District 4: Edward L. Hamilton (Republican)
 House District 5: Carl E. Mapes (Republican)
 House District 6: Patrick H. Kelley (Republican)
 House District 7: Louis C. Cramton (Republican)
 House District 8: Joseph W. Fordney (Republican)
 House District 9: James C. McLaughlin (Republican)
 House District 10: Gilbert A. Currie (Republican)
 House District 11: Frank D. Scott (Republican)
 House District 12: W. Frank James (Republican)
 House District 13: Charles Archibald Nichols (Republican)

Population

Sports

Baseball

 1920 Detroit Tigers season – Under manager Hughie Jennings, the Tigers finished seventh in the American League with a record of 61–93. The team's statistical leaders included Ty Cobb with a .334 batting average, Bobby Veach with 113 RBIs and 65 extra-base hits, and Howard Ehmke with 15 wins and a 3.25 earned run average.
 1920 Michigan Wolverines baseball season - Under head coach Carl Lundgren, the Wolverines compiled a 17–6–2 record and won the Big Ten Conference championship. Slicker Parks was the team captain.

American football

 1920 Michigan Wolverines football team – Under head coach Fielding H. Yost, the Wolverines compiled a 5–2 record. Center Ernie Vick was selected as a first-team All-Big Ten Conference player.
 1920 Michigan Agricultural Aggies football team – Under head coach Potsy Clark, the Aggies compiled a 4–6 record and outscored their opponents 270 to 166, including a 109 to 0 victory over Olivet College on October 30, 1920. 
 1920 Michigan State Normal Normalites football team – Under head coach Elton Rynearson, the Normalites compiled a record of 6–2 and outscored all opponents by a combined total of 132 to 86.
 1920 Detroit Titans football team – The Titans shut out six of ten opponents, outscored all opponents by a combined total of 279 to 32, and finished with an 8–2 record under head coach James F. Duffy.
 1920 Central Michigan Normalites football team – Under head coach Joe Simmons, the Central Michigan football team compiled a 4–3–1 record, shut out four of eight opponents, and outscored all opponents by a combined total of 166 to 41.
 1920 Western State Hilltoppers football team – Under head coach William H. Spaulding, the Hilltoppers compiled a 3–4 record and were outscored by their opponents, 131 to 119.

Basketball

 1919–20 Michigan Wolverines men's basketball team – The team compiled a record of 10–13.  E. J. Mather was in his first year as the team's coach, and Ralph O. Rychener was the team captain.

Other
 1919–20 Michigan College of Mines men's ice hockey team – In the first season of college ice hockey in the state, the Michigan College of Mines (later renamed Michigan Technological University) team compiled a 1–2–1 record under head coach E. R. Lovel.

Chronology of events

January

February

March

April

May

June

July

August

September

October

November

 November 27 - The Durant Building in Detroit, later renamed the General Motors Building and eventually Cadillac Place, was opened for business as the new headquarters for General Motors.

December

Births
 January 15 - Steve Gromek, Major League Baseball pitcher (1941–1957), in Hamtramck, Michigan
 January 22 - Margaret Hillert, author of more than 80 children's books, including the Dear Dragon series, in Saginaw, Michigan
 February 8 - Bob Bemer, computer scientist known for his work on the specifications for COBOL and the ASCII character codeset, in Sault Ste. Marie, Michigan
 February 18 - Eddie Slovik, U.S. soldier executed for desertion during World War II, in Detroit
 February 23 - Hall Overton, composer, jazz pianist and music teacher, in Bangor, Michigan
 April 9 - Art Van Damme, jazz accordionist, in Norway, Michigan
 April 22 - Alfred Burt, jazz musician who composed music for 15 Christmas carols, in Marquette, Michigan
 April 29 - David M. Nelson, football coach and Secretary-Editor of the NCAA Football Rules Committee for 29 years who was inducted into the College Football Hall of Fame, in Detroit
 May 31 - Francis P. Hammerberg, U.S. Navy diver who received the Medal of Honor posthumously for rescuing two fellow divers, in Daggett, Michigan
 July 13 - Don Ralke, prolific music arranger and composer for film and television and producer of the "Golden Throats" recordings, in Battle Creek, Michigan
 July 20 - Dominic Jacobetti, longest serving Michigan state legislator, served in state house from 1955 to 1994, in Negaunee, Michigan
 July 30 - Marie Tharp,  geologist and oceanographic cartographer who discovered the Mid-Atlantic Ridge, which led to acceptance of the theories of plate tectonics and continental drift, in Ypsilanti, Michigan
 August 19 - Ralph Story, television and radio personality best known as the host of The $64,000 Challenge, in Kalamazoo, Michigan
 September 1 - Charline White, first African-American woman to be elected to the Michigan Legislature, in Atlanta, Georgia
 September 13 - Charles Smith, actor (The Shop Around the Corner, The Major and the Minor) in Flint, Michigan
 October 11 - James Aloysius Hickey, Roman Catholic Cardinal and Archbishop of Washington, D.C. (1980-2000), in Midland, Michigan
 October 21 - Ruth Terry, singer and actress, in Benton Harbor, Michigan
 November 12 - Richard Quine, stage, film and radio actor, and television director, in Detroit

Gallery of 1920 births

Deaths
 January 14 - John Francis Dodge, automobile manufacturing pioneer and co-founder of Dodge Brothers Company, at age 55 in New York City
 January 21 - Ferris S. Fitch Jr., Michigan Superintendent of Public Instruction (1891–1892), at age 66 in Detroit
 February 4 - Ed Siever, Major League Baseball pitcher (1901-1908) and AL ERA leader (1902), at age 44 in Detroit
 April 2 - Matty McIntyre, Major League Baseball outfielder (1901-1912) led AL in runs scored (1908), at age 39 in Detroit
 July 21 - Otto Kirchner, Michigan Attorney General (1877–1880), at age 74 in Detroit
 December 10 - Horace Elgin Dodge, automobile manufacturing pioneer and co-founder of Dodge Brothers Company, in Palm Beach, Florida
 December 14 - George Gipp, Notre Dame football player and native of Laurium, Michigan, in South Bend, Indiana

Gallery of 1920 deaths

See also
 History of Michigan
 History of Detroit

References